Abel Julien Pagnard (July 3, 1859 — November 16, 1913) was a French engineer and was the architect of the Commercial Port of Arroyo (now Puerto Rosales) near the city of Punta High in the south of the province of Buenos Aires, Argentina.

1913 deaths
1859 births
French civil engineers
19th-century French engineers
20th-century Argentine engineers
Argentine civil engineers